Ricardo Rafael de Oliveira Torres, or simply Rafael Torres (born 26 October 1989, in Campo Grande) is a Brazilian football midfielder. His last clubs were Tatran Prešov and Zemplín Michalovce.

Career
In August 2011, he joined Slovak club Tatran Prešov.  He made his debut for Prešov against ViOn Zlaté Moravce on 12 August 2011. On 14 September 2012, he moved to Zemplín Michalovce on half-year loan from Tatran.

References

External links
1. FC Tatran Prešov profile

1989 births
Living people
Brazilian footballers
Brazilian expatriate footballers
Association football midfielders
Roma Esporte Apucarana players
Sport Club Internacional players
1. FC Tatran Prešov players
MFK Zemplín Michalovce players
Slovak Super Liga players
2. Liga (Slovakia) players
Expatriate footballers in Slovakia
Brazilian expatriate sportspeople in Slovakia
People from Campo Grande
Sportspeople from Mato Grosso do Sul